Amélie Claire Leroy (1851–1934) was an English writer, who wrote over 60 works often using the pseudonym Esmè Stuart.

Life
Leroy lived for a while with the novelist Anna Rachel Bramston (Witham 1848/9–1931) and they adopted a daughter called Juliette. Bramston, the daughter of John Bramston, founded Winchester High School, a boarding school for girls, in 1884; the school is now called St Swithun's School.

In 1903, Leroy wrote a letter to the Secretary of The Rhodes Trust asking to admit women to the Rhodes Scholarship. Her request was refused.

Literature
Leroy wrote seven dozen novels, many of them aimed at young women, in the late Victorian and Edwardian eras. One of her best known series, the Harum Scarum novels, features the wild Australian schoolgirl Antonia "Toney" Whitburn, forced to live with her aristocratic aunt and uncle in England.

Bibliography
"The Good Old Days, or, Christmas under Queen Elizabeth ... With illustrations ... by H. S. Marks." (1876)
"The Little Brown Girl. A story for children." (1877)
"Master Trim's Charge. [A story.] ... With ... illustrations." (1879)
"Mimi: a story of Peasant Life in Normandy." (1879)
"The Belfry of St. Jude. A story." (1880)
"How They Were Caught in a Trap. A Tale of France in 1802." (1880)
"Overtaken by the Tide; or, holidays at Old Port. A story, etc." (1881)
"Vanda. A story." (1881)
"The White Chapel. A story." (1881)
"Adé, a story of German life ... With illustrations, etc." (1882)
"Isabeau's Hero. A story of the Revolt of the Cevennes." (1882)
"Lia A Tale of Nuremberg." (1883)
"The Fate of Castle Löwengard: a story of the days of Luther ... With illustrations, etc." (1884)
"An Out-of-the-way-Place. A story." (1884)
"The Prisoner's Daughter. A story of 1758." (1884)
"A faire damzell. A novel." (1885)
"Jesse Dearlove: a story." (1885)
"The Last Hope. [A tale.] ... Illustrated, etc." (1885)
"A Little Place. [A tale.]" (1885)
"Miss Fenwick's Failures; or, “Peggy Pepper-Pot,” etc." (1885)
"The Unwelcome Guest. A story for girls. Illustrated by M. E. Butler." (1886)
"Ursula's Fortune. A story." (1886)
"For Half a Crown. A story ... With ... illustrations." (1887)
"The Goldmakers. [A tale.]" (1887)
"In his Grasp. [A tale.]" (1887)
"Muriel's Marriage: a novel" (1887)
"Carried Off. A Story of Pirate Times" (1888)
"Daisy's King. (How Mick Keverne won the race.) [Two tales.]" (1888)
"An Idle Farthing. A story, etc." (1888)
"Joan Vellacot. A novel." (1888)
"Edgar's Wife. A story." (1889)
"One for the Other: stories of French life." (1889)
"Out of Reach. A Story for Girls" (1890) 
"Cast Ashore, etc." (1890)
"The Vicar's Trio, a story ... With ... illustrations." (1890)
"Kestell of Greystone." (1891)
"The Silver Mine. An underground story, etc." (1891)
"A Brave Fight, and other stories." (1892)
"A Nest of Royalists, etc. (A tale of the second French Revolution.)." (1892)
"A Small Legacy. A story for children, etc." (1892)
"Virginie's Husband. A novel" (1892)
"By Right of Succession" (1893)
"Claudea's Island." (1893)
"A Woman of Forty. A monograph." (1893)
"Inscrutable." (1894)
"The Power of the Past. A novel." (1894)
"Harum Scarum: The Story of a Wild Girl" (1895)
"Married to order; a romance of modern days ..." (1895)
"Arrested. A novel." (1896)
"The Footsteps of Fortune." (1896)
"Harum Scarum. A poor relation." (1896)
"A Mine of Wealth." (1896)
"Tangled Threads." (1897)
"By Reeds and Rushes: a story." (1898)
"The Knights of Rosemullion, etc." (1898)
"The Strength of Two: a novel." (1998)
"Sent to Coventry." (1898)
"In the dark" (1899)
"Christalla. An unknown quantity. [A tale.]" (1900)
"The Strength of Straw. [A Novel.]" (1900)
"For Love and Ransom ... Second edition." (1905)
"Mona: a Manx idyll, etc." (1905)
"Harum Scarum ... Sixteenth thousand." (1905)
"A Charming Girl" (1907)
"Two Troubadours. A story ... With illustrations by W. Herbert Holloway." (1912)
"Harum Scarum's Fortune" (1915)
"Harum Scarum Married, etc. (Originally published under the title of “Two Troubadours.”)." (1918)
"The Culture of Chris." (1919)
"The Taming of Tamzin ... Illustrated, etc." (1920)

Works with other authors:

"Astray: a tale of a country town. By C. M. Yonge, M. Bramston, C. Coleridge, E. Stuart." (1886)

References

External links 

 
 

English women writers
English children's writers
Victorian women writers
1851 births
1934 deaths